The ancient church of Sant'Alessandro is found on in via Garibaldi in Parma, Italy.

History
The church of Sant'Alessandro and the adjacent Benedictine monastery was founded first in the year 835, putatively patronized by Cunegonda, widow of Bernard of Italy, King of the Lombards.  In 837, Pope Gregory IV donated the remains of Pope Alexander I (Saint Alexander) to this church. The church was rebuilt in 1527 under the direction of the architect Bernardino Zaccagni, and in 1622-1624 under designs by Giovanni Battista Magnani. The monastic community was dissolved by Napoleon in 1810, and the abbey was mostly later supplanted by the Royal Theater of Parma.

Interior Decoration
The ceiling of the nave was frescoed by Angelo Michele Colonna, while Alessandro Tiarini completed the cupola frescoes of the Redeemer, Madonna and angels carrying the instruments of the passion, and by four pendants with Saints Bonaventure, Gertrude, Berthold, and Alexander. Tiarini also painted an altarpiece of St Berthold for the church.  In the third chapel on the left, is a painting of the Madonna and child with St. Maurus and Benedict, attributed to Sebastiano Ricci. The main altarpiece was painted by Girolamo Bedoli, and depicts the Madonna and child granting St Giustina the palm of martyrdom, while Saint Benedict grants St Alexander a incense bearer. The organ, non-functioning, dates from 1856, and was constructed by Antonio Sangalli.

References

Religious buildings and structures completed in 835
9th-century churches in Italy
17th-century Roman Catholic church buildings in Italy
Roman Catholic churches completed in 1624
Alessandro
Baroque architecture in Parma
9th-century establishments in Italy